Alvin William "A. W." Holt (born August 26, 1946) is a retired professional basketball small forward who spent one season in the National Basketball Association (NBA) as a member of the Chicago Bulls during the 1970–71 season. He attended Jackson State University.

External links
 

1946 births
Living people
American men's basketball players
Chicago Bulls players
Jackson State Tigers basketball players
Small forwards
Undrafted National Basketball Association players